Unbound is a validating, recursive, and caching DNS resolver product from NLnet Labs. It is distributed free of charge in open-source form under the BSD license.

Features

 Caching resolver with prefetching of popular items before they expire
 DNS over TLS forwarding and server, with domain-validation
 DNS over HTTPS
 Query Name Minimization
 Aggressive Use of DNSSEC-Validated Cache
 Authority zones, for a local copy of the root zone
 DNS64
 DNSCrypt
 DNSSEC validating
 EDNS Client Subnet

History
Originally designed by Jakob Schlyter of  Kirei and Roy Arends of Nominet in 2004, funding was provided by VeriSign and ep.net to develop a prototype written in Java (David Blacka and Matt Larson, VeriSign). In 2006, the prototype was re-written for high-performance in the C programming language by NLnet Labs. 

Unbound is designed as a set of modular components that incorporate modern features, such as enhanced security (DNSSEC) validation, Internet Protocol Version 6 (IPv6), and a client resolver application programming interface library as an integral part of the architecture. Originally written for POSIX-compatible Unix-like operating system, it runs on FreeBSD, OpenBSD, NetBSD, macOS, and Linux, as well as Microsoft Windows.

Reception
Unbound has supplanted the Berkeley Internet Name Daemon (BIND) as the default, base-system name server in FreeBSD and OpenBSD, where it is perceived as smaller, more modern, and more secure for most applications.

See also
 NSD, an authoritative name server, also from NLnet Labs
 Comparison of DNS server software

References

External links
 
 Running Unbound in a Docker Container
 Unbound DNS Tutorial with examples and explanations

DNS software
Free network-related software
Free software programmed in C
DNS server software for Linux
Software using the BSD license